Up in Mabel's Room is a 1926 American silent comedy film directed by E. Mason Hopper and starring Marie Prevost and Harrison Ford. It is based on the 1919 play of the same name by Wilson Collison and Otto Harbach.

The film was remade in 1944 starring Marjorie Reynolds, Dennis O'Keefe and Gail Patrick.

Cast
 Marie Prevost as Mabel Ainsworth
 Harrison Ford as Garry Ainsworth
 Phyllis Haver as Sylvia Wells
 Harry Myers as Jimmy Larchmont
 Sylvia Breamer as Alicia
 Carl Gerard as Arthur Walters
 Arthur Hoyt as Simpson
 William Orlamond as Hawkins
 Paul Nicholson as Leonard Mason
 Maude Truax as Henrietta

Preservation status
A print of Up in Mabel's Room is held by the Museum of Modern Art (MOMA).

References

External links

 
 
 

1926 films
1926 comedy films
Silent American comedy films
American silent feature films
American black-and-white films
American films based on plays
Films directed by E. Mason Hopper
Producers Distributing Corporation films
1920s American films